Wachwa Runtu (Quechua wachwa Andean goose, runtu egg, "Andean goose egg", also spelled Huachhuarunto) is a mountain in the Cordillera Central in the Andes of Peru which reaches a height of approximately . It is located in the Junín Region, Chupaca Province, Yanacancha District, and in the Lima Region, Yauyos Province, Laraos District.

References 

Mountains of Peru
Mountains of Junín Region
Mountains of Lima Region